Jameh Mosque of Aradan is related to the Qajar dynasty and is located in Aradan, adjacent to the Imamzadeh Shah.

See also
 Islam in Iran

References

Mosques in Iran
Mosque buildings with domes
National works of Iran
Aradan